William "Bill" McKinney is the former President and Professor of American Religion of Pacific School of Religion (PSR) in Berkeley, California, the oldest theological seminary in the American West. McKinney is a sociologist of religion by training and also an ordained minister in the United Church of Christ.  (UCC)  His research interests include Protestant congregational dynamics, and the recent history and prospects for Mainline Protestant denominations. At PSR from July 1986 to June 2010, McKinney was previously Dean of Hartford Seminary.

Publications

Books

Roof, Wade Clark, and William McKinney. American Mainline Religion: Its Changing Shape and Future. New Brunswick, [N.J.]: Rutgers University Press, 1987.  in 888 WorldCat libraries.
McKinney, William. The Responsibility People: Eighteen Senior Leaders of Protestant Churches and National Ecumenical Agencies Reflect on Church Leadership. Grand Rapids, Mich: W.B. Eerdmans, 1994 in 146 worldcat libraries  
McKinney, William, David A. Roozen, and Jackson W. Carroll. Religion's Public Presence: Community Leaders Assess the Contribution of Churches and Synagogues. An Alban Institute publication. Washington, DC: Alban Institute, 1982.  in 60 WorldCat libraries.
McKinney, William. Public Perceptions of the United Church of Christ: An Exploratory Study. New York: Board for Homeland Ministries, 1982.

References

External links
 "Bringing religion to the masses" - SFGate
 "Rainbow flag hangs proudly at California religion school" - Seattle Times
 "Following Faith: Finding Faith in an Unlikely Place" - Daily Californian
 "Obama, Warren and the new evangelicals" - SFGate
 "GTU ministry students ponder love and relationships" - Berkeley Daily Planet
 "Christian Seminary Applauds California Court Same-Sex Marriage Decision" - Worldwide Faith News

Colby College alumni
Graduate Theological Union
United Church of Christ ministers
Year of birth missing (living people)
Living people